The Jesse Chisholm Grave Site is a commemorative site in rural Blaine County, Oklahoma. The site is also believed to include the burial site of Chief Left Hand, whose camp Chisholm was visiting at the time of his death. A nearby spring is named Left Hand Spring in the chief's honor. The site is a historical reminder of the friendship between the two men, who had an enduring friendship despite significant hostility between whites and Native Americans at the time.

The site of Chisholm's burial is marked by a simple granite marker bearing the words "Jesse Chisholm // Born 1805 // DIED MAR 4 1868 // NO ONE LEFT HIS HOME COLD OR HUNGRY".  The site was listed on the National Register of Historic Places in 1971.  It is maintained by the Oklahoma Historical Society.

See also
National Register of Historic Places listings in Blaine County, Oklahoma

References

National Register of Historic Places in Blaine County, Oklahoma
Buildings and structures completed in 1868
Monuments and memorials in Oklahoma
Geography of Blaine County, Oklahoma
Tourist attractions in Blaine County, Oklahoma